Ramosmania is a genus of two species of small trees in the family Rubiaceae.

References

External links 
 
 

Rubiaceae genera
Octotropideae